The Bayer designation Psi Orionis (ψ Ori / ψ Orionis) is shared by two stars in the constellation Orion:
 25 Orionis (ψ1), a Be star
 30 Orionis (ψ2, often just called ψ Orionis), an ellipsoidal and eclipsing variable

Orionis, Psi
Orion (constellation)